Jakob Fabricius can refer to:

 Jakob Faber (theologian) (1537–1613), Evangelical-Lutheran theologian (see German page)
 Jakob Fabricius (theologian) (1593–1654), Evangelical-Lutheran theologian (see German page)
 Jacob Christian Fabricius (1840–1919), Danish composer and musician